Kim Marie Alexis (born July 15, 1960) is an American supermodel and actress who was famous in the 1970s and 80s. She appeared on the cover of magazines like Sports Illustrated, Vogue, Harper's Bazaar, Glamour, Self and Cosmopolitan.

Early life
Alexis was born in Lockport, New York, and grew up in the suburbs of Buffalo. Her father, Robert, was a chemical engineer.  Her mother's name is Barbara. She also has a sister. She started to be a swimmer at the age of six and began to swim competitively through her senior year at Lockport High School. She attended college at the University of Rhode Island, and was accepted into a five-year pharmacy program.

Alexis was raised Presbyterian, and she and her family attended church every Sunday.

Modeling
Alexis was one of the top models of the late 1970s and early to mid 1980s, identified along with Gia Carangi, Carol Alt, Patti Hansen, Christie Brinkley, Kelly Emberg, Iman, Janice Dickinson, and Paulina Porizkova.  In 1983 she became the face of Revlon's premium Ultima II line, replacing Lauren Hutton.

Television
In the early 1990s, Alexis hosted health shows, such as Healthy Kids on the Family Channel and Lifetime.

In the late 1990s, she was host of Daily Edition, a syndicated program distributed by MGM.

She also appeared with Mike Ditka in the last episode of Cheers, "One for the Road" in 1993.

In 2005, she appeared on VH1's reality competition But Can They Sing?, where celebrities, who have never sung before, get the chance to perform in front of an audience. Alexis was eliminated in week two.

Film
Alexis appeared in the 1993 movie Body Bags, and the 1998 movie Holy Man with Eddie Murphy.

Advertising
In 1995, Alexis became the spokeswoman for Alpine Lace Brands, Inc., promoting the company's Alpine Lace low-fat cheese products.

Personal life 
Alexis is divorced from former NHL hockey player Ron Duguay, with whom she has a son, Noah. She also has two sons, Jamie and Bobby, with ex-husband Jim Stockton. Alexis raised her family in Ponte Vedra Beach, Florida.

Filmography

References

External links
 
 
 

1960 births
21st-century American women
American female models
American television actresses
Female models from New York (state)
Living people
Participants in American reality television series
People from Lockport, New York